The Fiji [Amateur] Cycling Association or FACA is the national governing body of cycle racing in Fiji.

The FACA is a member of the UCI and the OCC.

External links
 Fiji Cycling Association official website

The Fiji Cycling Association is now known as Cycling Fiji

National members of the Oceania Cycling Confederation
Cycle racing organizations
Cycle racing in Fiji
Cycling